Lisa Feldman Barrett is  professor of psychology at Northeastern University, where she focuses on affective science. She is a director of the Interdisciplinary Affective Science Laboratory. Along with James Russell, she is the founding editor-in-chief of the journal Emotion Review. Along with James Gross, she founded the Society for Affective Science.

Biography
Barrett was born in 1963 in Toronto, Ontario, Canada, to a working poor family and was the first member of her extended family to attend university. After graduating from the University of Toronto with honors, she pursued a Ph.D. in clinical psychology at the University of Waterloo with the goal of becoming a therapist, until a frustrating puzzle sidetracked her from a clinical career. As a graduate student, she failed eight times to replicate a simple experiment, finally realizing that her seeming failed attempts were, in fact, successfully replicating a previously undiscovered phenomenon. The resulting research direction became her life's work: understanding the nature of emotion in the brain. Following a clinical internship at the University of Manitoba Medical School, she held professorships in psychology at Penn State University, Boston College, and Northeastern University. Over two decades, she transitioned from clinical psychology into social psychology, psychophysiology, cognitive science, and cognitive neuroscience.

Barrett is most inspired by William James, Wilhelm Wundt, and Charles Darwin. In 2019–2020, she served as president of the Association for Psychological Science. From 2018–2021, she was ranked in the top one percent of the most-cited scientists in the world over a ten-year period.

In addition to academic work, Barrett has written two science books for the public, How Emotions are Made (2017) and Seven and a Half Lessons About the Brain (2020), and her TED talk was among the 25 most popular worldwide in 2018.

Professional history

Study of human emotions

At the beginning of her career, Barrett's research focused on the structure of affect, having developed experience-sampling methods and open-source software to study emotional experience. Barrett and members at the Interdisciplinary Affective Science Laboratory study the nature of emotion broadly from social-psychological, psychophysiological, cognitive science, and neuroscience perspectives, and take inspiration from anthropology, philosophy, and linguistics. They also explore the role of emotion in vision and other psychological phenomena.

In 1996, she joined the Psychology Faculty at Boston College. Before that she was an assistant professor of clinical psychology at the Pennsylvania State University.

Her research has focused on the main issues in the science of emotions such as: 

What are the basic building blocks of emotional life?
Building blocks of emotional life
Why is it that people quickly and effortlessly perceive anger, sadness, fear in themselves and others, yet scientists have been unable to specify a set of clear criteria for empirically identifying these emotional events?
What roles do language and conceptual knowledge play in emotion perception
Are there really differences between the emotional lives of men and women (see )

Theory of constructed emotion

Barrett developed her current theory of constructed emotion originally during her graduate training.

According to Barrett, emotions are "not universal, but vary from culture to culture" (see Emotions and culture). She says that emotions "are not triggered; you create them. They emerge as a combination of the physical properties of your body, a flexible brain that wires itself to whatever environment it develops in, and your culture and upbringing, which provide that environment."

Honors and awards

 Independent Scientist Research (K02) Award, National Institute of Mental Health, 2002–2007.
 Fellow, Association for Psychological Science, 2003.
 Fellow, Society for Personality and Social Psychology, 2005.
 Fellow, American Psychological Association, 2005.
 Career Trajectory Award, Society of Experimental Social Psychology, 2006.
Cattell Fund Fellowship, 2007–2008.
 NIH Director's Pioneer Award, 2007–2012, to study how the brain creates emotion.
 Kavli Fellow, National Academy of Sciences, 2008.
 Elected Fellow, American Association for the Advancement of Science, 2008.
 Arts in Academics award, University of Waterloo, 2010.
 Excellence in Research and Creative Activity Award, Northeastern University, 2012.
 Elected Fellow, Royal Society of Canada, 2012.
 Award for Distinguished Service in Psychological Science, American Psychological Association, 2013.
 Elected Fellow, Society of Experimental Psychologists, 2013.
 Diener Award in Social Psychology, Society for Personality and Social Psychology, 2014.
 Heritage Wall of Fame, Foundation for Personality and Social Psychology, 2016.
 Mentor Award for Lifetime Achievement, Association for Psychological Science, 2018.
 Elected Fellow, American Academy of Arts and Sciences, 2018.
 President, Association for Psychological Science, 2019–2020.
 Guggenheim Fellowship in neuroscience, 2019.
 John P. McGovern Award in the Behavioral Sciences, American Association for the Advancement of Science, 2020.
APA Award for Distinguished Scientific Contributions, American Psychological Association, 2021.
Mentorship Award in Affective Science, Society for Affective Science, 2022.

Books
 Seven and a Half Lessons About the Brain. Houghton Mifflin Harcourt, 2020. .
 How Emotions are Made: The Secret Life of the Brain. Houghton Mifflin Harcourt, 2017. .

See also

 Sapir–Whorf hypothesis
 List of University of Waterloo people

References

External links
 Publications

American women psychologists
Canadian women psychologists
Emotion psychologists
American women neuroscientists
American cognitive neuroscientists
Northeastern University faculty
Harvard Medical School people
1963 births
Living people
Scientists from Toronto
University of Toronto alumni
University of Waterloo alumni
American women academics
21st-century American women scientists